Australian Journalist of the Year may refer to:
 
Young Australian Journalist of the Year
Graham Perkin Australian Journalist of the Year Award
Gold Walkley award for journalism